

Wilhelm Thomas (8 October 1892 – 24 August 1976) was a general in the Wehrmacht of Nazi Germany during World War II who commanded several divisions.  He was a recipient of the Knight's Cross of the Iron Cross.

Awards and decorations

 Knight's Cross of the Iron Cross on  13 October 1941 as Oberst and commander of Infanterie-Regiment 71

References

Citations

Bibliography

 

1892 births
1976 deaths
Lieutenant generals of the German Army (Wehrmacht)
Recipients of the clasp to the Iron Cross, 1st class
German Army personnel of World War I
Recipients of the Knight's Cross of the Iron Cross
German prisoners of war in World War II
People from Minden
People from the Province of Westphalia
Prussian Army personnel
Military personnel from North Rhine-Westphalia
German Army generals of World War II